Sokan (Russian and Yaghnobi: Сокан) is a village in Sughd Region, northwestern Tajikistan. It is part of the jamoat Anzob in the Ayni District. Its population was 11 in 2007. Near to the village there is located the Mazori Hatti Mullo.

References

Populated places in Sughd Region

Yaghnob